Swedish Masters International Badminton Championships or Swedish International Stockholm is an annual badminton tournament held in Sweden and hosted by Svenska Badmintonförbundet. It is part of the European Badminton Circuit. The tournament was started by Stockholms Badmintonförbund in 2004. Stockholms Badmintonförbund was running the tournament until 2008 and was handed over to Svenska Badmintonförbundet. The tournament was played in Sweden's capital Stockholm up until the 2013 edition. 
In 2014 the tournament moved to Uppsala, about 1 hour north of Stockholm, and was run by former Swedish player Pär-Gunnar Jönsson. The 2016 edition represented the first BE International Challenge circuit tournament with the new increased prize money from US$15,000 to US$17,000, and will reach $25,000 by 2018. The Swedish Masters tournament also has one of the most unusual tournament trophies, in a circular shape representing the ring on the cork of the shuttle, with all the names of previous winners engraved on the inside.

In 2017 the tournament went back to an International Series from its previous position as an International Challenge and moved to a new home in Lund, just north of Malmo. The tournament also reverted to its original name of Swedish International from the previous three editions as the Swedish Masters. 

In 2018 the tournament will revert to the name of Swedish Open (badminton), as used between 1956 and 2000. The tournament will be hosted in Lund as an International Series.

Past winners

Performances by nation

References

External links
Official Site
New Official Site

2004 establishments in Sweden
Recurring sporting events established in 2004
Badminton tournaments in Sweden